Mycoscience is a peer-reviewed scientific journal covering all aspects of basic and applied research on fungi, including lichens, yeasts, oomycetes, and slime moulds. It is the official journal of the Mycological Society of Japan. A publication of the Mycological Society of Japan, it was founded in 1956 as Transactions of the Mycological Society of Japan (1956–1993) and was later titled Mycoscience (1994–present).

Editor-in-Chief
The following persons have been editor-in-chief of the journal:
 1956–1969 - Rokuya Imazeki
 1970–1971 -  Minoru Hamada
 1972–1973 - Hiroharu Indo
 1974–1975 - Keisuke Tsubaki
 1976 - Minoru Hamada
 1976 - Kiyoo Aoshima
 1977–1978 - Akinori Ueyama
 1979–1980 - Syunichi Udagawa
 1981–1984 - Shinichi Hatanaka
 1985–1988 - Tatsuo Yokoyama
 1989–1990 - Yukio Harada
 1991–1992 - Kishio Hatai
 1995–1996 - Kazuko Nishimura
 1997–1998 - Takao Horikoshi
 1999–2000 - Masatoshi Saikawa
 2001–2004 - Makoto Kakishima
 2005–2006 - Akira Nakagiri
 2007–2008 - Gen Okada
 2009–2010 - Takashi Yaguchi
 2011–2012 - Yoshitaka Ono
 2013–2014 - Gen Okada
 2015–2016 - Takayuki Aoki (Mycologist)
 2017–2018 - Tsutomu Hattori
 2019–2020 - Eiji Tanaka
 2021–present - Yutaka Tamai

Abstracting and indexing 
Mycoscience is abstracted and indexed in:

According to the Journal Citation Reports, the journal has a 2020 impact factor of 1.223.

References

External links 

 
 Publication site

Mycology journals
English-language journals
Publications established in 1956
Bimonthly journals
Springer Science+Business Media academic journals